John, Prince of Antioch (1431–1457), was the second son of Infante Peter, Duke of Coimbra, and Isabella of Urgell, Duchess of Coimbra.

Life 
He took part in the Battle of Alfarrobeira, where his father's army was defeated by the Portuguese royal army.

He was imprisoned and was to be executed. However, due to the intervention of his aunt Isabella, he was sent into exile in Burgundy together with his brother James and sister Beatrice. His aunt Isabella, Duchess of Burgundy, was able to offer protection to her nephews and niece as wife of Duke Philip the Good. In 1456, John was elected a Knight of the Order of the Golden Fleece.

In 1456, John married Charlotte of Cyprus in Nicosia and was accorded the title Prince of Antioch. He was poisoned on the orders of his mother-in-law, Helena Palaiologina.

He was buried in Nicosia in a tomb which bears his coat of arms.

Coat of arms

Following his marriage to Charlotte, John bore a unique coat of arms, combining: (I) the Kingdom of Jerusalem, (II) his father's Portuguese-English ascentry, (III) the Kingdom of Armenia, (IV) the Kingdom of Cyprus; on top the arms of Lusignan.

Ancestry

Notes

Sources 
 Raphael de Smedt (Ed.): Les chevaliers de l’ordre de la Toison d’or au XVe siècle. Notices bio-bibliographiques. (Kieler Werkstücke, D 3) Verlag Peter Lang, Frankfurt 2000, p. 135f.
Genealogical information on John of Coimbra, Prince of Antioch (in Portuguese)
 Nobreza de Portugal e Brasil, Vol. I, pages 270/1. Published by Zairol Lda., Lisbon, 1989.

1431 births
1457 deaths
15th-century Portuguese people
Assassinated nobility
Deaths by poisoning
House of Aviz
Jure uxoris officeholders
Knights of the Golden Fleece
People murdered in Cyprus
People of the Kingdom of Cyprus
Portuguese infantes
Portuguese nobility
Portuguese people murdered abroad
Princes of Antioch